The South African National Road Race Championship is a road bicycle race that takes place inside the South African National Cycling Championship, and decides the best cyclist in this type of race. The first race winner of the road race championship was Malcolm Lange in 1995; Malcolm Lange is the only cyclist to have won the championships three times. The women's record is held by Anriette Schoeman with 7 wins.

Men

Elite

Under-23

Women

Elite

Notes

References

External links
Past winners on cyclingarchives.com

National road cycling championships
Cycle races in South Africa
Recurring sporting events established in 1995
1995 establishments in South Africa
Cycling